Stichobasis postmeridianus is a species of moth of the Psychidae family that was discovered in 2010 in the Maltese Islands. The species is featured in the journal of the Entomological Society of Malta.

References

Moths described in 2009
Psychidae